Ben Oxenbould is an Australian actor and comedian. His brother Jamie Oxenbould is also an actor, as is Jamie's son, Ed Oxenbould.

Early career 
He was educated at North Sydney Boys High School. In 1980, Oxenbould was cast as "Hubert 'Fatty' Finn" in the film Fatty Finn. He then appeared in several films and television programs, including E Street, Home and Away, G. P. and Echo Point. Oxenbould was cast as the character "Ben" in the sitcom, Hey Dad..!, appearing on the show between 1991 and 1994.

On 24 March 2010, Oxenbould appeared on Australian television programme A Current Affair to support claims of sexual abuse made by fellow actor, Sarah Monahan. Oxenbould claimed to have witnessed another child actress being molested by a male cast member.

Comedy 
From 2003 to 2005 Oxenbould featured as one of the ensemble cast of the sketch comedy series Comedy Inc., in which he was noted for several characters, including his parody of cricketer Shane Warne. A review of Comedy Inc: The Late Shift published in The Australian in 2005 described Oxenbould's performance in the show as: "continu[ing] to display a gift for parody and a range that goes from high camp to seriously blue collar." He left the program in 2005.

Film 
In 2007 he starred in the film Black Water, a thriller set in the Australian outback and featuring a man-eating crocodile. In 2010 he appeared in the film Wicked Love: The Maria Korp Story, a film based on the true story of Maria Korp who was murdered by her husband's lover in 2005. Oxenbould has also done extensive work as a voice-over artist, as well as work in short films and theatre.

Filmography

Film

Television

Philanthropy 
In 2000 Oxenbould helped set up the BBAS Memorial School, a school in Bardia, Nepal, a remote Nepalese mountain village. In 2005, he organised a fundraiser for the school, which was supported by Australian entertainers, including singers Tex Perkins and Tim Rogers, comedian Akmal Saleh. Artwork by the school's students was auctioned.

References

External links
 

1969 births
Living people
Australian male comedians
Australian male film actors
Australian male television actors
Male actors from Adelaide
People educated at North Sydney Boys High School